Edward Thomas Jones  Wrench (11 January 1828 – 26 October 1893) was an Australian businessman. Wrench was born in London, England and died in Woollahra, New South Wales.  He was buried at St John's Ashfield.

See also

 Thomas Sutcliffe Mort

References

1828 births
1893 deaths
19th-century Australian businesspeople